Herbert Richard Orr (3 February 1865 – 22 May 1940) was an English cricketer who played four first-class matches for Cambridge University and Western Australia between 1886 and 1892.

Born in Kensington in London, Orr was educated at Bedford School and Jesus College, Cambridge. He played for Cambridge University in 1886 and 1887. He played a single match for the Melbourne Cricket Club against Lord Sheffield's XI during the English team's 1891–92 tour, and later moved to Western Australia, where he was the state's inaugural cricket captain. Orr captained the team in each of its first two matches, with Western Australia losing both.

Returning to England in 1899, Orr was made a second lieutenant in the Cadet Corps (Bedford County School) in 1902, attached to the 1st Bedfordshire Regiment of the Royal Engineers. He went on to play 111 minor counties matches for Bedfordshire County Cricket Club between 1900 and 1921, and his brothers, Rowland and John Orr, also both represented Bedfordshire in minor counties matches. Orr died in Sevenoaks, Kent, in May 1940.

References

1865 births
1940 deaths
Bedfordshire cricketers
Cambridge University cricketers
English cricketers
People educated at Bedford School
Alumni of Jesus College, Cambridge
Sportspeople from Kensington
Western Australia cricketers